Cormocephalus elegans is a species of centipede of the family Scolopendridae found in North Africa.

The name Cormocephalus elegans zuluinus is a synonym for Cormocephalus westwoodi anceps.

References

External links 
 

Animals described in 1903
elegans
Invertebrates of North Africa